This page lists all described genera and species of the spider family Antrodiaetidae. , the World Spider Catalog accepts 41 species in 2 genera:

Aliatypus

Aliatypus Smith, 1908
 Aliatypus aquilonius Coyle, 1974 — USA
 Aliatypus californicus (Banks, 1896) (type) — USA
 Aliatypus coylei Hedin & Carlson, 2011 — USA
 Aliatypus erebus Coyle, 1974 — USA
 Aliatypus gnomus Coyle, 1974 — USA
 Aliatypus gulosus Coyle, 1974 — USA
 Aliatypus isolatus Coyle, 1974 — USA
 Aliatypus janus Coyle, 1974 — USA
 Aliatypus plutonis Coyle, 1974 — USA
 Aliatypus roxxiae Satler & Hedin, 2013 — USA
 Aliatypus starretti Satler & Hedin, 2013 — USA
 Aliatypus thompsoni Coyle, 1974 — USA
 Aliatypus torridus Coyle, 1974 — USA
 Aliatypus trophonius Coyle, 1974 — USA

Antrodiaetus

Antrodiaetus Ausserer, 1871
 Antrodiaetus apachecus Coyle, 1971 — USA
 Antrodiaetus ashlandensis Cokendolpher, Peck & Niwa, 2005 — USA
 Antrodiaetus cerberus Coyle, 1971 — USA
 Antrodiaetus coylei Cokendolpher, Peck & Niwa, 2005 — USA
 Antrodiaetus effeminatus Cokendolpher, Peck & Niwa, 2005 — USA
 Antrodiaetus gertschi (Coyle, 1968) — USA
 Antrodiaetus hadros (Coyle, 1968) — USA
 Antrodiaetus hageni (Chamberlin, 1917) — USA
 Antrodiaetus lincolnianus (Worley, 1928) — USA
 Antrodiaetus metapacificus Cokendolpher, Peck & Niwa, 2005 — USA
 Antrodiaetus microunicolor Hendrixson & Bond, 2005 — USA
 Antrodiaetus montanus (Chamberlin & Ivie, 1935) — USA
 Antrodiaetus occultus Coyle, 1971 — USA
 Antrodiaetus pacificus (Simon, 1884) — USA
 Antrodiaetus pugnax (Chamberlin, 1917) — USA
 Antrodiaetus riversi (O. Pickard-Cambridge, 1883) — USA
 Antrodiaetus robustus (Simon, 1891) — USA
 Antrodiaetus roretzi (L. Koch, 1878) — Japan
 Antrodiaetus stygius Coyle, 1971 — USA
 Antrodiaetus unicolor (Hentz, 1842) (type) — USA
 Antrodiaetus yesoensis (Uyemura, 1942) — Japan

References

Antrodiaetidae
Antrodiaetidae